Wes Phillips (born February 17, 1979) is an American football coach and former player who is the offensive coordinator for the Minnesota Vikings of the National Football League (NFL). He is the son of former Denver Broncos, Buffalo Bills, and Dallas Cowboys head coach Wade Phillips and the grandson of former Houston Oilers and New Orleans Saints head coach Bum Phillips.

Early years

Wes Phillips was born in Houston, Texas when his grandfather was the head coach of the Houston Oilers and his father was serving as their defensive line coach. The younger Phillips attended the University of Texas at El Paso, where he earned three letters playing football for the Miners after playing and graduating from Williamsville North High School. He was a backup quarterback during the 2000 season, when UTEP won the Western Athletic Conference title. As a senior, Phillips became the starting quarterback, completing 143 of 257 passes for 1,839 yards with 10 touchdowns and 11 interceptions while also scoring two rushing touchdowns. In 2001, he graduated from UTEP with a bachelor's degree in philosophy.

Playing career

Phillips played professional football in 2002 and 2003 as a quarterback with the San Diego Riptide of the af2 arena football league.

Coaching career

Early coaching career

Following his playing career, Phillips returned to his alma mater UTEP, where he spent one season as a student assistant. In 2004, he was hired as quarterbacks coach at West Texas A&M University. In 2005, the Buffaloes went 10-2 and won the Lone Star Conference with an 8–1 mark with NCAA Division II's top-ranked passing offense. Phillips helped guide the development of quarterback Dalton Bell, who was a finalist for the Harlon Hill Trophy. After two seasons, Phillips was then hired for the same position at Baylor in 2006.

Dallas Cowboys
After his father (Wade) was hired as head coach of the Cowboys in 2007, Wes joined his father's staff as a quality control/offensive assistant coach. Working together for the first time, the coaches Phillips helped the Cowboys to win NFC East titles in 2007 and 2009. But after a 1–7 start in 2010, Wade Phillips was fired. Wes remained in Dallas working under his father's successor Jason Garrett, and was promoted to the position of assistant offensive line coach in 2011 and 2012, before being named tight ends coach for the 2013 season.

Washington Redskins
In 2014, Phillips joined the Washington Redskins as tight ends coach under new head coach Jay Gruden. It was here that Phillips first began working with Sean McVay, who had preceded Phillips as Washington's tight ends coach before being elevated to offensive coordinator. With the Redskins, Phillips worked with notable tight ends like Vernon Davis and Jordan Reed, the latter of whom made the Pro Bowl following the 2016 season.

Los Angeles Rams
On February 12, 2019, Phillips joined the Los Angeles Rams as tight ends coach, where he was again reunited with both McVay, now the Rams' head coach, and his father, who was the Rams' defensive coordinator. He remained with the organization in 2020 even though his father did not. In 2021, Phillips added the title of pass game coordinator in addition to his role as tight ends coach. Phillips earned his first Super Bowl ring when the Rams defeated the Cincinnati Bengals in Super Bowl LVI.

Minnesota Vikings
On February 20, 2022, Phillips was hired by the Minnesota Vikings to serve as the team's offensive coordinator for the 2022 season.

References

1979 births
Living people
American football quarterbacks
Baylor Bears football coaches
Dallas Cowboys coaches
Minnesota Vikings coaches
Los Angeles Rams coaches
Players of American football from Houston
Sportspeople from Houston
UTEP Miners football coaches
UTEP Miners football players
Washington Redskins coaches
West Texas A&M Buffaloes football coaches
National Football League offensive coordinators